Zeinolabedin Mahallati or Zayn al-Abidin ibn Muhammad ibn Ali al-Mahallati (Persian: زين العابدين محلاتي ; Arabic: زين العابدين بن محمد بن علي المحلاتي ) was an eminent Persian calligrapher who was active in the period around the 1870s. He lived in Mahallat, under the Qajari Persia. He produced several gold illuminated Korans and Tafsir books.

References and notes

Iranian calligraphers
19th-century calligraphers
19th-century Iranian writers